The 1886–87 season is the 13th season of competitive football by Rangers.

Overview
Rangers played a total matches during the 1886–87 season.

Results
All results are written with Rangers' score first.

Scottish Cup

FA Cup

See also
 1886–87 in Scottish football
 1886–87 Scottish Cup

References

External links
1886–87 Rangers F.C.Results

Rangers F.C. seasons
Rangers